The HTC P4350 is a Pocket PC smartphone manufactured by High Tech Computer Corporation (HTC) of Taiwan. It is also known as the HTC Herald, T-Mobile Wing, and XDA Terra. An updated model running Windows Mobile 6, the HTC P4351, has been sold as the HTC Atlas. It features a right-side QWERTY slide and runs the Windows Mobile 6.0/6.1 Professional Edition operating system.

Basics 
 Size: 2.3 x 4.3 x 0.7 inches
 Weight: 6 ounces 
 Internal battery: Li-Ion polymer 
 Talk time: up to 4 hours 
 Standby time: up to 6 days 
 Band (frequency): 850 MHz; 900MHz ;1800MHz; 1900 MHz

Features 
Windows Mobile 6.0/6.1 (P4351 and P4350 under some licenses) or Windows Mobile 5 (P4350)
Built-in right side QWERTY Keypad
GPRS/EDGE and Wi-Fi enabled
2.0-megapixel camera (2.0 After Quality Loss from origin 2.3)
E-mail
myFaves capable
Voice-activated functions
MicroSD memory slot (P4351: MicroSDHC)
Bluetooth wireless technology
Video camera
Picture messaging
Real web browsing
Instant messaging: Yahoo!, MSN, and AOL
Quad-band world phone (850/900/1800/1900 MHz)
Text messaging
Speaker phone 
Wireless calendar synchronization with Outlook
Windows Media Player

Services 
Call Forwarding
Call Waiting
Caller ID
Customer Care
Emergency Calls

Messaging 
Instant messaging: Yahoo!, MSN, and AOL instant messaging, and text messaging.
For Google GTalk users, there is a Java-based free client available, called MGtalk.
The HTC P4350 can connect to Microsoft Office Communication Server using the Office Communicator 2007 Mobile client which allows chat with users on corporate network and access to a corporate address book.

The VoIP client Skype works well on WiFi, but it will inhibit performance of the device. WiFi drains the battery quickly.

It has Outlook Mobile as email client, which works well with most of the email service providers and supports standard protocols like POP, IMAP, SMTP. The push-mail functionality works with Exchange 2003 SP2, Exchange 2007 and above email servers using the ActiveSync protocol.

The P4350 is equipped with a slide out qwerty keyboard.

External links 
Official Spec Sheet
Official support page at HTC
Official T-Mobile Page 
Official Windows Mobile Page
HTC Source: a news blog dedicated to HTC devices
HTC Wiki Page: The official HTC Smartphone Forum.

P4350
Windows Mobile Professional devices
Mobile phones with an integrated hardware keyboard